The Royal Exchange is a grade II listed building in Manchester, England. It is located in the city centre on the land bounded by St Ann's Square, Exchange Street, Market Street, Cross Street and Old Bank Street. The complex includes the Royal Exchange Theatre and the Royal Exchange Shopping Centre.

The Royal Exchange was heavily damaged in the Manchester Blitz and in the 1996 Manchester bombing. The current building is the last of several buildings on the site used for commodities exchange, primarily but not exclusively of cotton and textiles.

History, 1729 to 1973

The cotton industry in Lancashire was served by the cotton importers and brokers based in Liverpool who supplied Manchester and surrounding towns with the raw material needed to spin yarns and produce finished textiles.  The Liverpool Cotton Exchange traded in imported raw cotton. In the 18th century, the trade was part of the slave trade in which African slaves were transported to America where the cotton was grown and then exported to Liverpool where the raw cotton was sold. The raw cotton was processed in Manchester and the surrounding the cotton towns and Manchester Royal Exchange traded in spun yarn and finished goods throughout the world including Africa. Manchester's first exchange opened in 1729 but closed by the end of the century. As the cotton industry boomed, the need for a new exchange was recognised.

Thomas Harrison designed the new exchange of 1809 at the junction of Market Street and Exchange Street. Harrison designed the exchange in the Classical style. It had two storeys above a basement and was constructed in Runcorn stone. The cost, £20,000, was paid for in advance by 400 members who bought £50 shares and paid £30 each to buy the site. The semi-circular north façade had fluted Doric columns.  The exchange room where business was conducted covered 812 square yards. The ground floor also contained the members' library with more than 15,000 books. The basement housed a newsroom lit by a dome and plate-glass windows, its ceiling was supported by a circle of Ionic pillars spaced 15 feet from the walls. The first-floor dining-room was accessed by a geometrical staircase. The exchange opened to celebrate of the birthday of George III in 1809. It also contained other anterooms and offices.

As the cotton trade continued to expand, larger premises were required and its extension was completed in 1849. The Exchange was run by a committee of notable Manchester industrialists. From 1855 to 1860 the committee was chaired by Edmund Buckley.

The second exchange was replaced by a third designed by Mills & Murgatroyd, constructed between 1867 and 1874. It was extended and modified by Bradshaw Gass & Hope between 1914 and 1931 to form the largest trading hall in England. The trading hall had three domes and was double the size of the current hall. The colonnade parallel to Cross Street marked its centre. On trading days merchants and brokers struck deals which supported the jobs of tens of thousands of textile workers in Manchester and the surrounding towns. Manchester's cotton dealers and manufacturers trading from the Royal Exchange earned the city the name, Cottonopolis.

The exchange was seriously damaged during World War II when it took a direct hit from a bomb during a German air raid in the Manchester Blitz at Christmas in 1940. Its interior was rebuilt with a smaller trading area. The top stages of the clock tower, which had been destroyed, were replaced in a simpler form. Trading ceased in 1968, and the building was threatened with demolition.

Architecture

The exchange has four storeys and two attic storeys built on a rectangular plan in Portland stone. It was designed in the Classical style. Its slate roof has three glazed domes and on the ground floor an arcade orientated east to west. It has a central atrium at first-floor level. The ground floor facade has channelled rusticated piers and the first, second and third floors have Corinthian columns with entablature and a modillioned cornice. The first attic storey has a balustraded parapet while the second attic storey has a mansard roof.  At the north-west corner is a Baroque turret and there are domes over other corners. The west side has a massive round-headed entrance arch with wide steps up and the first and second floor windows have round-headed arches. The third floor and first attic storey have mullioned windows.

Theatre
The building remained empty until 1973, when it was used to house a theatre company (69 Theatre Company); the company performed in a temporary theatre but there were plans for a permanent theatre whose cost was then estimated at £400,000. The Royal Exchange Theatre was founded in 1976 by five artistic directors: Michael Elliott, Caspar Wrede, Richard Negri, James Maxwell and Braham Murray. The theatre was opened by Laurence Olivier on 15 September 1976. In 1979, the artistic directorship was augmented by the appointment of Gregory Hersov.

The building was damaged on 15 June 1996 when an IRA bomb exploded in Corporation Street less than 50 yards away. The blast caused the dome to move, although the main structure was undamaged. That the adjacent St Ann's Church survived almost unscathed is probably due to the sheltering effect of the stone-built exchange. Repairs, which were undertaken by Birse Group, took over two years and cost £32 million, a sum provided by the National Lottery. While the exchange was rebuilt, the theatre company performed in Castlefield. The theatre was repaired and provided with a second performance space, the Studio, a bookshop, craft shop, restaurant, bars and rooms for corporate hospitality. The theatre's workshops, costume department and rehearsal rooms were moved to Swan Street. The refurbished theatre re-opened on 30 November 1998 by Prince Edward. The opening production, Stanley Houghton's Hindle Wakes was the play that should have opened the day the bomb was exploded.

In 1999, the Royal Exchange was awarded "Theatre of the Year" in the Barclays Theatre Awards, in recognition of its refurbishment and ambitious re-opening season.

In 2014 Sarah Frankcom was appointed the sole artistic director.

In January 2016 the Royal Exchange was awarded Regional Theatre of the Year by The Stage. In announcing the award, The Stage said: "This was the year that artistic director Sarah Frankcom really hit her stride at the Royal Exchange. The Manchester theatre in the round's output during 2015 delivered its best year in quite some time."

In January 2018, the Royal Exchange Young Company won the "School of the Year" award at The Stage Awards 2018.

On 28 March 2019, the Royal Exchange announced that Sarah Frankcom was stepping down as Artistic Director of the Theatre to take up a new post as Director of the prestigious drama school LAMDA. On 8 July 2019, the theatre announced the appointment of Bryony Shanahan and Roy Alexander Weise as Joint Artistic Directors.

Theatres

The theatre features a seven-sided steel and glass module that squats within the building's Great Hall. It is a pure theatre in the round in which the stage area is surrounded on all sides, and above, by seating. Its unique design conceived by Richard Negri of the Wimbledon School of Art is intended to create a vivid and immediate relationship between actors and audiences. As the floor of the exchange was unable to take the weight of the theatre and its audience, the module is suspended from the four columns carrying the hall's central dome. Only the stage area and ground-level seating rest on the floor. The 150-ton theatre structure opened in 1976 at a cost of £1 million amid some scepticism from Mancunians.

The theatre can seat an audience of up to 800 on three levels, making it the largest theatre in the round in The World. There are 400 seats at ground level in a raked configuration, above which are two galleries, each with 150 seats set in two rows.

The Studio is a 90-seat studio theatre with no fixed stage area and moveable seats, allowing for a variety of production styles (in the round, thrust etc.) Prior to 2020, the studio acted as host to a programme of visiting touring theatre companies, stand-up comedians and performances for young people.

Theatre programme 
The Royal Exchange gives an average of 350 performances a year of nine professional theatre productions. Performances by the theatre company are occasionally given in London or from a 400-seat mobile theatre.
The company performs a varied programme including classic theatre and revivals, contemporary drama and new writing. Shakespeare, Ibsen and Chekhov have been the mainstay of its repertoire but the theatre has staged classics from other areas of the canon including the British premieres of La Ronde and The Prince of Homburg and revivals of The Lower Depths, Don Carlos and The Dybbuk. American work has also been important – Tennessee Williams, O'Neill, Miller, August Wilson – as has new writing, with the world premieres of The Dresser, Amongst Barbarians, A Wholly Healthy Glasgow and Port to its name.

The Royal Exchange also presents visiting theatre companies in the Studio; folk, jazz and rock concerts; and discussions, readings and literary events. It engages children of all ages in drama activities and groups and has performances including these children and teens.  Performances include "The Freedom Bird" and "The Boy Who Ran from the Sea".

Key productions
The company has produced a very wide range of plays from 31 Shakespeare revivals to over 100 premieres; from neglected European classics to adaptations of famous novels. The many critically acclaimed and award-winning productions include:

 The Rivals by Richard Brinsley Sheridan. One of the two opening productions, directed by Braham Murray with Tom Courtenay, Christopher Gable and Patricia Routledge (1976)
 The Prince of Homburg by Heinrich von Kleist. The other opening production, directed by Casper Wrede with Tom Courtenay and Christopher Gable (1976)
 The Lady from the Sea by Ibsen. Directed by Michael Elliott with Vanessa Redgrave (1978)
 The Dresser by Ronald Harwood. World premiere directed by Michael Elliott with Tom Courtenay and Freddie Jones (1980)
 The Duchess of Malfi by John Webster. Directed by Adrian Noble with Helen Mirren, Bob Hoskins and Pete Postlethwaite (1980)
 Waiting for Godot by Samuel Beckett. Directed by Braham Murray with Max Wall and Trevor Peacock (1980)
 Hamlet. Directed by Braham Murray with Robert Lindsay (1983)
 Moby Dick. World premiere adapted and directed by Michael Elliott with Brian Cox (1984)
 As You Like It. Directed by Nicholas Hytner with Janet McTeer (1986)
 Riddley Walker by Russell Hoban. World Premiere directed by Braham Murray with David Threlfall (1986)
 Edward II by Christopher Marlowe. Directed by Nicholas Hytner with Ian McDiarmid and Michael Grandage (1986)
 Don Carlos by Schiller. Directed by Nicholas Hytner with Ian McDiarmid and Michael Grandage (1987)
 All My Sons by Arthur Miller. Directed by Greg Hersov with John Thaw and Michael Maloney (1988)
 Macbeth. Directed by Braham Murray with David Threlfall and Francis Barber (1988)
 Arms and the Man by Bernard Shaw with Catherine Russell and Adrian Lukis (1988/89)
 Donny Boy by Robert Glendinning (TMA Award for best new play).World premiere directed by Casper Wrede (1990)
 Death and the King's Horseman by Wole Soyinka. World premiere directed by Phyllida Lloyd with George Harris and Claire Benedict (1990)
 Your Home in the West by Rod Wooden. World premiere directed by Braham Murray with David Threlfall, Lorraine Ashbourne and Andy Serkis (1991)
 Romeo and Juliet. Directed by Greg Hersov (TMA Award) with Michael Sheen and Kate Byers (1992)
 Look Back in Anger by John Osborne. Directed by Greg Hersov with Michael Sheen and Claire Skinner (1995)
 Hindle Wakes by Stanley Houghton. Directed by Helena Kaut-Howson (MEN Award) with Ewan Hooper and Sue Johnston. See IRA bombing above. (1996) and (1998)
 Much Ado About Nothing. Directed by Helena Kaut-Howson (MEN Award) with Josie Lawrence (MEN Award), Michael Muller and Ewan Hooper (MEN Award) (1997)
 Poor Superman by Brad Fraser. British premiere directed by Marianne Elliott (MEN Award) with Sam Graham (MEN Award) and Luke Williams (MEN Award) (1997)
 Peer Gynt by Henrik Ibsen. Directed by Braham Murray with David Threlfall (1999)
 Snake in Fridge by Brad Fraser (MEN Award). World premiere directed by Braham Murray (MEN Award) with Adam Sims (MEN Award) and Kellie Bright (2000)
 Hedda Gabler by Henrik Ibsen. Directed by Braham Murray with Amanda Donohoe (MEN Award), Terence Wilton and Simon Robson (2001)
 The Homecoming by Harold Pinter. Directed by Greg Hersov with Pete Postlethwaite (MEN Award) (2002)
 Othello. Directed by Braham Murray with Paterson Joseph and Andy Serkis (2002)
 Port by Simon Stephens (Pearson Award). World premiere directed by Marianne Elliott with Emma Lowndes (MEN Award) and Andrew Sheridan (2002)
 Hobson's Choice by Harold Brighouse. Directed by Braham Murray with Trevor Peacock, John Thomson and Joanna Riding (2003)
 Antony and Cleopatra. Directed by Braham Murray with Josette Bushell-Mingo, Tom Mannion and Terence Wilton (2005)
 On the Shore of the Wide World by Simon Stephens (Olivier Award). World premiere directed by Sarah Frankcom with Nicholas Gleaves, Siobhan Finneran (MEN Award) and Eileen O'Brien (2005)
 Henry V. Directed by Jonathon Munby with Elliot Cowan (MEN Award) (2007)
 Roots by Arnold Wesker. Directed by Jo Combes with Claire Brown and Denise Black (MEN Award) (2008)
 The Children's Hour by Lillian Hellman. Directed by Sarah Frankcom with Maxine Peake (MEN Award), Charlotte Emmerson and Kate O'Flynn (TMA Award) (2008)
 The Glass Menagerie by Tennessee Williams. Directed by Braham Murray with Brenda Blethyn (TMA Award) (2008)
 Punk rock by Simon Stephens (MEN Award). World premiere directed by Sarah Frankcom (MEN Award) with Jessica Raine (MEN Award) and Tom Sturridge (MEN Award and Critics' Circle Award)( 2009)
 A Raisin in the Sun by Lorraine Hansberry. Directed by Michael Buffong (MEN Award) with Ray Fearon (MEN Award), Starletta DuPois(MEN Award) and Jenny Jules (MEN Award) (2010).
 Pygmalion by George Bernard Shaw. Directed by Greg Hersov with Cush Jumbo, Simon Robson, Terence Wilton and Ian Bartholomew (MEN Award) (2010)
 Mogadishu by Vivienne Franzmann. World premiere directed by Matthew Dunster with Ian Bartholomew, Malachi Kirby and Shannon Tarbet (Manchester Theatre Awards) (2011)
 A View From The Bridge by Arthur Miller. Directed by Sarah Frankcom with Con O'Neill (Manchester Theatre Awards) and Ian Redford (2011)
 As You Like It. Directed by Greg Hersov with Cush Jumbo (Ian Charleson Award), Ben Batt, Kelly Hotten, Ian Bartholomew, Terence Wilton and James Clyde (2011)
 Wonderful Town by Leonard Bernstein (Manchester Theatre Awards).Produced in partnership with the Hallé Orchestra and The Lowry with Connie Fisher, Lucy van Gasse and Michael Xavier. The orchestra was conducted by Mark Elder. The production was the last one directed by Braham Murray as artistic director of the Royal Exchange (2012)
 Miss Julie by August Strindberg. Directed by Sarah Frankcom with Maxine Peake (Manchester Theatre Awards), Liam Gerrard, Joe Armstrong and Carla Henry (2012)
 The Accrington Pals by Peter Whelan. Directed by James Dacre with Emma Lowndes, Sarah Ridgeway, Robin Morrissey and Gerard Kearns. UK Theatre Award for best design (2013)
 A Doll's House by Henrik Ibsen. Directed by Greg Hersov with Cush Jumbo (Manchester Theatre Awards)(Theatre Awards UK), David Sturzaker, Kelly Hotten, Jack Tarlton and Jamie De Courcey (2013)
 Sweeney Todd by Stephen Sondheim. Co-production with West Yorkshire Playhouse directed by James Brining with David Birrell as Sweeney Todd and Gillian Bevan as Mrs Lovett (2013) 
 The Last Days of Troy by Simon Armitage. Directed by Nick Bagnall with Gillian Bevan, David Birrell, Richard Bremner and Lily Cole (2014)
 Billy Liar by Keith Waterhouse and Willis Hall. Directed by Sam Yates with Harry McEntire (Manchester Theatre Awards), Emily Barber(Manchester Theatre Awards), Jack Deam, Rebekah Hinds, Lisa Millett (2014)
 Hamlet. Directed by Sarah Frankcom with Maxine Peake, John Shrapnel, Barbara Marten, Gillian Bevan (Manchester Theatre Awards) and Claire Benedict (2014)
 Breaking the Code by Hugh Whitemore (Manchester Theatre Award). Directed by Robert Hastie with Daniel Rigby (Manchester Theatre Award),Natalie Dew(Manchester Theatre Award) Phil Cheadle, Dmitri Gripari and Geraldine Alexander (2016)
 Sweet Charity: Book by Neil Simon, music by Cy Coleman and Lyrics by Dorothy Fields (Manchester Theatre Award) . Directed by Derek Bond with Kaisa Hammarlund, Daniel Crossley (Manchester Theatre Award), Bob Harms and Josie Benson (2016)

The Bruntwood Prize
In 2005, the Royal Exchange Theatre launched the Bruntwood Playwriting Competition to encourage a new generation of playwrights from the UK and Ireland. The competition had its roots in two regional competitions called WRITE which attracted over 400 entries. The first two competitions resulted in three festivals of new writing which showcased eight new writers, one of whom, Nick Leather, became writer in residence. The theatre produced his script, All the Ordinary Angels, in October 2005.

In 2006, 1,800 scripts were submitted for consideration. The winning entry was Ben Musgrave's Pretend You Have Big Buildings for which he received a prize of £15,000 and his play was performed as part of the Manchester International Festival 2007.
In 2008 the Exchange and Bruntwood ran a second competition. Judges included Brenda Blethyn, Michael Sheen, Roger Michell and actor/director Richard Wilson. The £40,000 prize fund was split equally between Vivienne Franzmann for Mogadishu (main house and Lyric Hammersmith 2011), Fiona Peek for Salt (The Studio 2010), Andrew Sheridan for Winterlong (The Studio, 2011) and Naylah Ahmed for Butcher Boys.

Notable people

Directors

The company has been run by a group of artistic directors since its inception. According to Braham Murray: -"Although the names have changed we have remained a team of like-minded individuals sharing a common vision of the purpose and potency of theatre." These individuals include
 Michael Elliott (1976–1984)
 James Maxwell (1976–1995)
 Braham Murray (1976–2012)
 Richard Negri (1976–1986)
 Caspar Wrede (1976–1990)
 Greg Hersov (1987– 2014)
 Marianne Elliott (1998–2002)
 Matthew Lloyd (1998–2001)
 Sarah Frankcom (2008–2019)
 Bryony Shanahan (2019– )
 Roy Alexander Weise (2019– )

In 2014 Sarah Frankcom became the sole artistic director.

Associate Artistic Directors include:-

Nicholas Hytner (1985–1989), Ian McDiarmid (1986–1988) and Phyllida Lloyd (1990–1991).

Many other directors have worked at the Royal Exchange amongst them Lucy Bailey, Michael Buffong, Robert Delamere, Jacob Murray, Adrian Noble, Steven Pimlott and Richard Wilson.

The company is renowned for its innovative designers, composers and choreographers which include Lez Brotherston, Johanna Bryant, Chris Monks, Alan Price, Jeremy Sams, Rae Smith and Mark Thomas.

Actors

Throughout its history the theatre has attracted great actors and a number of them have taken on many roles over the years. Actors who have been particularly associated with the Exchange and have appeared in several different productions include : -
Lorraine Ashbourne, Brenda Blethyn, Tom Courtenay, Amanda Donohoe, Gabrielle Drake, Lindsay Duncan, Ray Fearon, Michael Feast, Robert Glenister, Derek Griffiths, Dilys Hamlett, Julie Hesmondhalgh, Claire Higgins, Paterson Joseph, Cush Jumbo, Ben Keaton, Robert Lindsay, Ian McDiarmid, Tim McInnerny, Janet McTeer, Patrick O'Kane, Daragh O'Malley Trevor Peacock, Maxine Peake, Pete Postlethwaite, Linus Roache, David Schofield, Andy Serkis, Michael Sheen, Andrew Sheridan, David Threlfall and Don Warrington.

Other notable actors have appeared at the theatre and these include Brian Cox, Albert Finney, Alex Jennings, Ben Kingsley, Leo McKern, Helen Mirren, David Morrissey, Gary Oldman, Vanessa Redgrave, Imogen Stubbs, John Thaw, Harriet Walter, Julie Walters and Sam West.

The company has always had a reputation for spotting young actors before they became famous. Kate Winslet, Hugh Grant, David Tennant, Michael Sheen,  Andrew Garfield and most recently Gabriel Clark all appeared at the Royal Exchange long before starring in film and television.

See also

Listed buildings in Manchester-M2

References

Bibliography

External links

 1874 – Royal Exchange, Manchester, Lancashire
 Royal Exchange Manchester
 The Bruntwood Playwriting Competition 2008
 The Bruntwood Playwriting Competition 2008 Blog

1921 establishments in England
Bradshaw, Gass & Hope buildings
Commercial buildings completed in 1914
Grade II listed buildings in Manchester
Producing theatres in England
Shopping centres in Manchester
Theatres in Manchester